is a Japanese football player. He plays for Japan Soccer College.

Playing career
Shusaku Tokita played for Matsumoto Yamaga FC, Fukushima United FC, Grulla Morioka and Azul Claro Numazu from 2013 to 2015. He moved to Japan Soccer College in 2016.

References

External links

1990 births
Living people
Meikai University alumni
Association football people from Chiba Prefecture
Japanese footballers
J2 League players
J3 League players
Japan Football League players
Matsumoto Yamaga FC players
Fukushima United FC players
Iwate Grulla Morioka players
Azul Claro Numazu players
Japan Soccer College players
Association football defenders